Warnaar Horstink (1756 – 1815), was an 18th-century painter from the Northern Netherlands.

Biography
He was born in Haarlem and grew up in the orphanage there and became the pupil of Cornelis van Noorde and Wybrand Hendriks. He is known for landscapes in oils and watercolours, and after he married he became a drawing teacher at the Haarlem Teeken Genootschap, where he was the teacher of Joannes Pieter Visser Bender.
He died of a heart attack in Haarlem while looking at drawings with his colleague Pieter Bartholomeusz Barbiers and his body was carried to his grave in the St. Bavochurch by the board members of the Genootschap.

References

Warnaar Horstink on Artnet

1756 births
1815 deaths
18th-century Dutch painters
18th-century Dutch male artists
Dutch male painters
Artists from Haarlem